Chinese farmer may refer to:

One who practices agriculture in China
In online role-playing games, a gold farmer whose in-game behavior noticeably stands out in comparison to the majority of subscribers

See also 
 Chinese Farm (disambiguation)